Alcachofa Soft is a video game developer in Toledo, Spain, founded in 1995 and specializing in graphic adventure games.

History
Its first work was the game Dráscula: The Vampire Strikes Back, a comedy adventure.

In 1997, it made Ping Pong. In 1998, it made Mortadelo y Filemón: El Sulfato Atómico, a graphic adventure based on the Spanish comic characters Mort & Phil and distributed by Grupo Zeta. It was successful and led to similar games based on the characters.

In 2000, it published El Tesoro de Isla Alcachofa a pirate adventure game which was Alcachofa Soft's first entirely independent product, without a publisher or external distributor.

Other Mort & Phil-based games it made were Mortadelo y Filemón: Dos Vaqueros Chapuceros and Mortadelo y Filemón: Terror, Espanto y Pavor (2000), Mortadelo y Filemón: Operación Moscú and Mortadelo y Filemón: El Escarabajo de Cleopatra (2001), Mortadelo y Filemón: Balones y patadones and Mortadelo y Filemón: Mamelucos a la romana (2002) and Mortadelo y Filemón: Una Aventura de Cine (2003).

In 2008, it made Murder in the Abbey, an homage to La Abadía del Crimen.

References

External links

Toledo, Spain
Video game companies established in 1995
Video game companies of Spain
Video game development companies
Spanish companies established in 1995